{{DISPLAYTITLE:C21H22O9}}
The molecular formula C21H22O9 (molar mass: 418.39 g/mol, exact mass: 418.1264 u) may refer to:

 Aloin, also known as barbaloin
 Liquiritin
 Natsudaidain, a flavanol

Molecular formulas